The Tar ( Tar, in its upper course Alaykuu ) is a river in Kara-Kulja District of Osh Region of Kyrgyzstan. It rises on the north slopes of the Alay Range (Pamir-Alay). At its confluence with the river Kara-Kulja east of Uzgen, the Kara Darya is formed. The section of the Tar upstream from the mouth of the Terek is called Alaykuu.

It is fed by majorly snow and ice meltwater and springs. Average annual discharge is 45.7 m³/s. The maximum flow is 214 m³/s in June-July and the minimum - 8.9 m³/s in January-February. The river is largely used for irrigation.

References

See also
 Osh Oblast Encyclopedia. Chief Editorial Board of Kyrgyz Soviet Encyclopedia. Frunze, 1987 (in Russian).

Rivers of Kyrgyzstan